Brad Rowe may refer to:

 Brad Rowe (actor) (born 1970), American actor
 Brad Rowe (footballer) (born 1969), Australian football player
 Brad Rowe (tennis), former tennis player from the United States